Wild Things is an eight episode reality television series which features three transgender women on a fundraising road-trip to earn money for a relative with a life-threatening disease. The series stars Maria Roman, Tiara Russell and Cassandra Cass.  The three women were first featured together in the documentary film Trantasia which chronicled contestants in the first ever 'World's Most Beautiful Transsexual Pageant'. Wild Things reunites the three transgender women as they visit small towns in the United States and work in traditionally macho jobs to earn cash to assist Maria's brother who is struggling with a critical illness.  The series premiered on Canadian television on The Movie Network and Movie Central on March 22, 2010. The series has also been featured on Entertainment Tonight Canada.

Season 1 Episodes
 EPISODE# 101  BULL-RIDING RANCH-HANDS (Ranch Part 1): “Do you ride it bareback?”
 EPISODE# 102  COWGIRLS GONE WILD (Ranch Part 2): “Nothing to fear, but fear itself”
 EPISODE# 103  FISHING FOR HOTDOGS: “We didn’t trick you… We just sold you a hot dog!”
 EPISODE# 104  BOXING KNOCKOUTS: “Madness! Mayhem! Shenanigans!”
 EPISODE# 105  GRAPES OF WRATH: “Girl, you just made jam with one foot!”
 EPISODE# 106  SLAUGHTERHOUSE THREE: “You gotta kill the cow before you grill the cow!”
 EPISODE# 107  ATV… OMG! “Girls, are you ready to ride?”
 EPISODE# 108  SECURITY! "Parting shots"

References

External links
 
 https://www.facebook.com/WildThingsTV
 http://www.themovienetwork.ca/series/wildthings/
 http://tvguide.ca/Watercooler/Top10/Articles/100322_TV_transgenders_wild_JV
 http://www.channelcanada.com/Article4157.html
 http://www.tvweekonline.ca/node/6911
 http://trantasiathemovie.com/
 

2010 American television series debuts
Transgender-related television shows
Trans women
2010s American LGBT-related television series
2010s LGBT-related reality television series